Dongxiang Autonomous County (Santa: Dunxianzu Zizhixien) is an autonomous county in the Linxia Hui Autonomous Prefecture, province of Gansu of the People's Republic of China. It was established as a Dongxiang ethnic autonomous area in 1950. Historically, Dongxiang has long been directly under the jurisdiction of Linxia. During the Republic of China (1912–1949) period, its area was divided between the surrounding counties.

Its population in 2020 was 381,700, 88% of whom belonging to the Dongxiang minority group. As of 1993, half of the total Dongxiang minority population lived in the county.

At least until the end of the 20th century, Dongxiang County was very impoverished and undeveloped, having a literacy rate of just 15%, the lowest in China. In 2017, it had the highest poverty rate of Gansu, already the poorest province in China.

Dongxiang County has a typical Loess Plateau landscape, with numerous gullies and mountains and a dry climate.

Administrative divisions 
Dongxiang Autonomous County is divided to 8 towns and 16 townships.
Towns

Townships

Climate

Culture 

Dongxiang County is the birthplace and center of Dongxiang culture. Its specialty food includes Pinghuo, a dish of steamed lamb.

Transport 
China National Highway 213

Sources 

 
Autonomous counties of the People's Republic of China
County-level divisions of Gansu
Dongxiang people